Old Wives Lake is a shallow endorheic salt lake in south central Saskatchewan, Canada, about  south-west of Moose Jaw. The lake is fed by the Wood River but seasonal water relatively flattened the terrain, and as such results in significant mudflats. A Migratory Bird Sanctuary was established at the lake on March 9, 1925. This lake, in conjunction with Reed Lake and Chaplin Lake, forms a site of hemispheric importance in the Western Hemisphere Shorebird Reserve Network. It was designated in April 1997, and is "one of the most important inland sites for migratory birds in North America". A variety of First Nations oral traditions explain the origin of the lake's name.  At various times during the lake's human history, it has attracted interest from several First Nations tribes, duck hunters, military trainers, sodium sulfate producers, conservationists, and birdwatchers.

Nearby communities include Old Wives and Mossbank. Access to the lake is from Highway 363. The Old Wives Lake is a popular destination for birdwatchers; a  walking trail has been constructed along the lake's south shore, along with viewing and picnic areas.

Name 
According to a Cree tradition recounted by Métis guides accompanying the North-West Mounted Police in 1874, sometime around 1840 a band of Cree hunters followed a herd of bison into Blackfoot territory and made camp near the lake.  Blackfoot scouts discovered this band and attacked. Although the Cree were able to defend themselves, they anticipated an attack by a larger Blackfoot war party the next morning.  The older women volunteered to stay behind to tend the fires through the night in the hope of fooling the Blackfoot into believing that they were not abandoning their camp to escape.  Using this diversion as cover, the rest of the Cree successfully fled back to their home territory in the Qu'Appelle valley.  When the Blackfoot arrived that morning they found only the old women, whom the Blackfoot killed in vengeance.  This commonly recited version of the lake's naming has been commemorated by a historical marker situated beside Highway 2 near the lake.  A variant telling of this narrative states that the Blackfoot warriors were so impressed by the women's courage that they left them alone and allowed them to rejoin their own people.  Another First Nations oral tradition describes how a band of Assiniboine fleeing from pursuing Blackfoot warriors abandoned the old women in their band who could not keep pace with everyone else. The women continued their effort to escape by wading across the lake. However, they misjudged the water's depth and drowned. An Assiniboine tradition associates the name with a battle which occurred at the lake around the beginning of the 19th century in which Assiniboines vanquished their Blackfoot enemies.  According to some First Nations traditions, the spirits of the dead women continue to haunt a small island in the lake from which their voices can be heard at night.

Some early accounts describing the region state that the name "Old Wives Lake" was originally applied to both the lake that currently bears that name and to nearby Chaplin Lake. In 1861, the British politicians Sir Frederick Johnstone and Henry Chaplin visited the area to hunt bison, antelope, and elk for sport. Explorer John Rae, who accompanied the expedition, named area lakes in honour of its members: The lake now called Old Wives Lake became Johnstone Lake and Chaplin Lake received the name by which it is still known.  Although the Canadian government officially adopted the designation "Johnstone Lake" in 1886; the First Nations peoples along with early ranchers and homesteaders in the area continued to refer to it as Old Wives Lake. In response to a petition by area residents to restore its traditional name, the Canadian board on geographical names formally renamed it Old Wives Lake in 1953.

History 
Tipi rings and other artifacts discovered near Old Wives Lake attest to a First Nations presence in the area long predating their contact with Europeans.  With the arrival of European settlers, ranchers and homesteaders occupied the area surrounding the lake. Until hunting was prohibited in the Old Wives Lake bird sanctuary, duck hunters gathered at the lake in the autumn to hunt the plentiful wild ducks and geese. During World War II a bombing and gunnery air training school established under the British Commonwealth Air Training Plan operated near the lake's shoreline, three miles east of Mossbank. Throughout the war, part of the lake and its surroundings were incorporated into a 23-mile bombing range used by trainee pilots. For some decades in the 20th century, especially during the 1950s and 1960s, sodium sulfate was harvested from the lake by diverting water into nearby Frederick Lake for evaporation. The sodium sulfate plant operated until 1977. In 1975, two Canadian Forces military training aircraft were involved in a mid-air collision over the lake which caused one of the aircraft to crash into it. The two pilots in this aircraft were able to parachute out and inflate emergency rubber dinghies enabling them to remain afloat until their rescue by a helicopter based out of CFB Moose Jaw.

Drought conditions caused the lake to dry up completely in 1937 and 1988.  In certain years, including 1951, 1959, 1980 and 1997, large numbers of ducks were found dead at the lake due to outbreaks of botulism.

Old Wives-Frederick Lakes IBA 
The Old Wives-Frederick Lakes (SK 031) Important Bird Area (IBA) of Canada is a protected area for birds that encompasses Old Wives and Frederick Lakes. Frederick Lake is a shallow basin adjacent to the south-western shore of Old Wives Lake. The site is home to numerous different bird species, including the endangered piping plover. The most commonly found birds include sanderlings and Baird's sandpipers. Other species include American white pelicans, Semipalmated sandpipers, stilt sandpipers, American avocets, double-crested cormorants, Franklin's gulls, ring-billed gulls, California gulls, common terns, mallards, and canvasbacks.

See also 
 List of lakes of Saskatchewan
 List of protected areas of Saskatchewan

References 

Lakes of Saskatchewan
Endorheic lakes of Canada
Saline lakes of Canada
Important Bird Areas of Saskatchewan